Vice-Admiral Gary Leslie Garnett CMM, CD is a retired officer of the Canadian Forces. He was Chief of the Maritime Staff from 9 January to 24 September 1997.

Career
Educated at Carleton University, Garnett joined the Royal Canadian Navy in 1963. He became commander of the destroyer  in 1982 and of the destroyer  in 1983 before taking charge of the Sea Training Unit Atlantic in 1984 and the Second Canadian Destroyer Squadron in 1986. He went on to be Director of Military Operations Coordination at the National Defence Headquarters in 1989, Executive Assistant to the Chief of the Defence Staff in 1990 and Director General Maritime Development in 1991. He then became Chief of Personnel Services in 1993, Commander Maritime Forces Atlantic in 1994 and Commander of Maritime Command (renamed Chief of the Maritime Staff when the Naval Headquarters returned from Halifax to Ottawa) during 1997. His last appointment was as Vice Chief of the Defence Staff later in 1997 before retiring in September 2001.

Awards and decorations
Garnett's personal awards and decorations include the following:

105px

110px

References

|-

Canadian admirals
Living people
Commanders of the Order of Military Merit (Canada)
Vice Chiefs of the Defence Staff (Canada)
Commanders of the Royal Canadian Navy
1945 births
Canadian military personnel from Nova Scotia